Pelletier, formerly known as Pelletier-Station, is a community in the town of Pohénégamook, Quebec, Canada. Pelletier's railway station was served by the National Transcontinental Railway, which became part of the Canadian National Railway.

References

Communities in Bas-Saint-Laurent
Canadian National Railway stations in Quebec